General elections were held in Sweden in 1890. Pro-free trade candidates received a majority of the vote. Gustaf Åkerhielm remained Prime Minister.

Campaign
The Free Traders and the new Swedish Social Democratic Party ran joint lists in some constituencies.

Results
Only 22.8% of the male population aged over 21 was eligible to vote. Voter turnout was 38.5%.

References

Sweden
General
General elections in Sweden